The Diocese of Västerås is a diocese within the Church of Sweden. Its Episcopal see is located in Västerås at Västerås Cathedral. The diocese was first established in the 12th century as part of the Roman Catholic church, but was made part of the Church of Sweden as a result of the Protestant Reformation in Sweden.

History
The diocese existed as a Catholic diocese from the 11th to the 16th century. The see was founded at Munktorp, then moved about 1100 to Västerås by the English Cluniac missionary David of Munktorp, who was Bishop of Västerå, and one of the patron saints of Västerås Cathedral.

Before 1118 the Diocese of Sigtuna was divided into the Diocese of Uppsala and that of Västerås. In 1134, Henry, Bishop of Sigtuna was transferred to Västerås. Heathenism was not extinct by 1182. Svec., II, I, 272-276).

Otto (1501–1522) completed the Västerås Cathedral. Peder Sunnanväder (1522–1523), formerly chancellor to Sten Sture the Elder, was executed for alleged treason in 1527. The last Catholic bishop, Petrus Magni (1524–1534), is supposed to have been consecrated 1 May 1524 in Rome. In 1527 a Diet was held at Västerås which Protestantized the Church of Sweden and separated it from the Holy See in Rome. Petrus Magni consecrated various bishops in 1528 and 1531 under protest. Though subjected latterly to humiliating tutelage by King Gustav I of Sweden, he retained the see until his death. The Dalecarlians rose repeatedly in defence of their religion, but were overcome by the cunning and violence of Gustav I.

The cathedral of Västerås and the parish church of Mora were the only important churches in the diocese. At Västerås there was a Dominican convent (founded 1234) and a Hospital of the Holy Spirit (founded 1345).  was extinct before 1318. The Cistercian  (Gudsberga kloster, Mons Domini) in Dalecarlia, founded in 1477, and colonized from Alvastra Abbey in 1486, lasted until 1544.

Gallery

See also
List of bishops of Västerås

References

Attribution
 The entry cites:
Historiskt-geographiskt och statistiskt Lexikon ofver Sverige, VII (Stockholm, 1866), 316–18; 
FANT, Scriptores rerum Svecicarum (Stockholm, 1818–1876);
LILJERGREN, Diplomatarium Svecanum, I-III and Indices I-II by KARLESON (Stockholm, 1829); 
SILFVERSTOPLE, Svenskt Diplomatarium, 1401-1420 (Stockholm, 1875); 
KRONINGSSVARD AND LIDEN, Diplomatarium Dalekarlicum (Stockholm, 1842); 
Konung Gustaf den Forstes Registratur. ed. GRANLUND IV (Stockholm, 1868); 
Breviarium Arosiense (Basle, 1853); 
Acta Sanctorum, IV (Paris, 1868); 
JORGENSEN, Den nordiske Kirkes Grundloeggelse, II (Copenhagen, 1878), 856–857, suppl. 96, 97; 
RENTERDAHL, Swenska kyrkaus historia (Lund, 1838); 
Israel Erlandsson (Lund, 1850); 
MARTIN, Gustave Vasa et la Reforme en Suede; **SOHLBERG, Domkyrkan i Westeraas (Westeraas, 1834); 
HALL, Bidrag till; Kannedomen om Cistercienserorden i Sverige (Gefle, 1899).

External links
 

 
Vasteras
Västerås
Västmanland County
Vasteras
Vasteras
Dioceses established in the 12th century